Benzweiler is an Ortsgemeinde – a municipality belonging to a Verbandsgemeinde, a kind of collective municipality – in the Rhein-Hunsrück-Kreis (district) in Rhineland-Palatinate, Germany. It belongs to the Verbandsgemeinde Simmern-Rheinböllen, whose seat is in Simmern. Benzweiler is a tourism municipality (Fremdenverkehrsgemeinde).

Geography

Location
The municipality lies in the Hunsrück.

History
Six barrows northeast of the village make it plain that Celts settled here in antiquity. Beginning in 1794, Benzweiler lay under French rule. In 1815 it was assigned to the Kingdom of Prussia at the Congress of Vienna. Since 1946, it has been part of the then newly founded state of Rhineland-Palatinate.

Population development
These are population figures for Benzweiler (for 31 December each time):

Politics

Municipal council
The council is made up of 6 council members, who were elected at the municipal election held on 7 June 2009, and the honorary mayor as chairman.

Mayor
Benzweiler's mayor is Hans-Joachim Kunz.

Culture and sightseeing

Buildings
The following are listed buildings or sites in Rhineland-Palatinate’s Directory of Cultural Monuments:
 Hauptstraße 4 – building with half-hipped roof, partly timber framing sided, about 1820

References

External links
Municipality’s official webpage 
Brief portrait of Benzweiler with film at SWR Fernsehen 

Municipalities in Rhineland-Palatinate
Rhein-Hunsrück-Kreis